Aliaksandr Kurliandchyk, (born November 25, 1971) is a Belarusian sprint canoer who competed from 2001 to 2006. He won four medals at the ICF Canoe Sprint World Championships with a silver (C-4 1000 m: 2001) and three bronzes (C-4 200 m: 2005, C-4 1000 m: 2002, 2006).

Kurliandchyk also finished sixth the C-2 500 m event at the 2004 Summer Olympics in Athens.

References

Sports-reference.com profile

1971 births
Belarusian male canoeists
Canoeists at the 2004 Summer Olympics
Living people
Olympic canoeists of Belarus
ICF Canoe Sprint World Championships medalists in Canadian